Orleans is a Brazilian municipality in the state of Santa Catarina. The town is located in the south of the state.  As of 2020, the estimated population was 23,038.

The municipality contains part of the  Serra Furada State Park, created in 1980.

History
Named after emperor Dom Pedro II's son-in-law, Gaston, Count of Eu, from the House of Orléans on December 26, 1884.
It was first colonized by Italians, then Germans, Austrians, Poles, Norwegians, Latvians, Dutch and other nationalities from Europe.

References

 http://www.orleans.sc.gov.br

Municipalities in Santa Catarina (state)